The 2009 SEC Women's Basketball Tournament took place on March 5–8, 2009 in North Little Rock, Arkansas at Alltel Arena.

Vanderbilt won the tournament and with it the SEC's automatic bid to the 2009 NCAA tournament. In the final, they upset top seed Auburn for the second time in three weeks; the Commodores were responsible for two of the Tigers' three losses going into the NCAA tournament.

Tournament

Asterisk denotes game ended in overtime.

All-Tournament Team

References

SEC women's basketball tournament
-
Sports in Little Rock, Arkansas
2009 in sports in Arkansas
College sports tournaments in Arkansas